Enga is a language of the East New Guinea Highlands spoken by a quarter-million people in Enga Province, Papua New Guinea. It has the largest number of speakers of any native language in New Guinea, and is second over all after Papuan Malay. 

An Enga-based pidgin is used by speakers of Arafundi languages.

History 
The Enga contain more than 150,000 people that occupy the mountainous region ranging from Mount Hagen and westward to Porgera. Enga people are known to be sedentary gardeners that grow sweet potatoes as their staple crop. Coffee and pyrethrum are also grown as cash crops in their culture and they also keep pigs, cattle, and fowls. Pigs, pearls, shells, axes, and plumes are items of wealth and signify social occasions when exchanged or circulated. Enga clans have definite boundaries defining their homesteads across the territory and have been known to fight with each other over land, women, and vengeance. Men and women traditionally occupy different homes because it is believed that women are unclean and can be dangerous to men.  The Enga culture does not include a chief or headman, but instead the wealthy men have the political and administrative control.

Phonology 
Vowel sounds include /i e ɑ o u/.  

A /k/ can range to sounding like a fricative between low and back vowels. /t/ is pronounced as an /r/ sound intervocalically. /ts/ may also be realised as [s] . All final vowels are devoiced. Alveolar stops /t, ⁿd/ may be realised as retroflex sounds /ʈ, ᶯɖ/.

The Enga alphabet includes 21 different letters, only two of which not being in the English alphabet.

Grammar

Nouns 
Similarly to the English language, Enga nouns use the determiners dóko and méndé as the and a, some, or else respectively. 

Noun classes in Enga have not been studied in great detail just yet, but they have been shown to be based primarily on syntactic features. These classes include animates, pronouns, body parts, inanimates, locationals, events, colors, inner states, and minor classes. Nouns may also be inflected for cases such as agentive AG , instrumental INST, possessive POSS, locative LOC, and temporal. In the chart below it shows the case distribution and the noun classes in relation to one another. 

Animates can occur in different subclasses such as proper names. Some examples of animates can include takánge (father), endángi (mother), Aluá (a man's name), Pasóne (a woman's name), or mená (pig). All of which would include a determiner being either demonstrative or indefinite and can be with the agentive or possessive cases, but not used instrumentally or locative. Pronouns in the Enga language can easily be identified and can vary from dialects:

 nambá I
 émba you
 baá he, she, it
 nalímba we two
 nyalámbo you two
 dolápo they two
 náima we plural
 nyakáma you plural
 dúpa they plural

These pronouns are similar to animates in that determiners may occur in agentive, and possessive cases, but not used instrumentally or locative. Body parts are in the animate class and can include words like kíngi (arm), pungí (liver), and yanúngí (skin, body). These differ from the previous classes in which they may have a determiner occur either instrumentally or locative, but not in the agentive or possessive cases. Location nouns are used to determine the place. These words can include kákasa (bush), Wápaka (Wabag- a place), or Lakáipa (Lagaipa- a river). This class only uses a determiner in the location case and nothing else.

The noun morphology of Enga is an exclusively suffixing language. These suffixes are generally the last member of the noun phrase, being either the determiner or the adjective. This expresses the inflectional categories of the noun such as tense, aspect, person, number, gender or mood. The suffixes can be broken down into two main groups: case suffixes and others. Case suffixes are exclusively expressed in noun and noun phrases while other suffixes can be on either noun and noun phrases or verb and verb phrases. Enga differentiates nouns from noun phrases though the case endings. There are seven different cases in which these are formally marked: associative -pa (only two)/ -pipa (two or more), agentive -me/-mi, instrumental -me/mi, possessive -nya, locative -nya/-sa/-ka, temporal -sa/-nya/-pa, and vocative -oo. Other suffixes, besides case suffixes, are broken into six different categories and occur only on nouns. There is the conjunctive suffix -pi meaning 'and' or 'even', two different suffixes -le meaning 'rather' or -yalé 'like' to indicate similarity, two different suffixes -mba 'very' or an argumentative -mba to indicate emphasis or contrast. These two forms of -mba differ in meaning as well as tone. When it is used in a argumentative sense it is said with a higher tone than previous syllables versus when it is used to emphasize.

Although it includes conjunctive suffixes, Enga does not actually include any conjunction words such as 'and' other than pánde 'or'. Instead those conjunctive suffixes are used to combine the noun or noun phrase with all the noun phrases and then typically followed by the determiner.

Verbs 
The verb morphology of Enga is an incredibly complex concept in the grammar of the language. This is due to the lack of subordinating or coordinating conjunctions such as 'and' or 'because', the lack of modal auxiliaries such as 'can' or 'want', and the lack of prepositions such as 'for' or 'to'. Instead, Enga uses a nearly unlimited number of concepts and kinds of actions expressed through different grammatical devices. The verb is known to dominate the Enga language. The main verb of a sentence is always expressed at the end. When there is a question, the suffix -pe/-pi  will occur at the end. 

Verb morphology in Enga, much like its noun morphology, is exclusively suffixing. There are two different categories in which the verb can be: person-number and tense-mode. There are five different tenses in Enga. This includes a future tense, a present tense, and three different past tenses. The immediate past refers to actions that occurred within the day. The near past refers to actions that occurred the previous day, a time in which the speaker does not recall, or a time before the previous day but is intending on comparing it to other events in the past. Finally, the far past refers to actions that occurred before the previous day. In terms of person-number, Enga expresses both singular, and plural verbs. However, a dual is also expressed when referring to actions or events that involve exactly two characters or two actions. The verb morphology has only one exception being that verbs are expressed with a prefix na-.

In sentences that express two different subjects or two different actions collectively, there unfortunately is no conjunction like most English speakers are used to. For example the sentence "He went and worked" would be expressed as the following:

When conjoined, instead of

 Baa p-e-a-pi baa-me kalai p-i-a.

It would be 

There are three different temporal suffixes. The -o marker expresses the originating, existing, or happening during the same period of time. In verbs that end in a high vowel it would be changed to a -u marker. The second temporal suffix if the -la  marker which indicates consecutiveness between sentences with the same subject. Finally, the -pa  marker conjoins sentences with different subjects but still contain consecutiveness. 

There are two different causal suffixes -pa and -sa. When the verb ends in a suffixed vowel regarding the past, these two suffixes are added together to fully conjugate the verb. 

Enga also includes conditional suffixes. These help distinguish what is considered 'real' conditions and 'irreal' conditions. A real condition is one in which real consequences can occur versus an irreal condition which denies the reality of the actions that are expressed as well as their consequences. To express a real conditional clause in the future tense the suffix -mo/-no are added to the verb with the addition of kandao dóko followed immediately after. For example when connecting the following two sentences: 

and

Together, as a conditional clause, it would form:

Word Order 
The crucial difference of the Enga language is that the main verb of the sentence will always be found in sentence-final position. This concept causes varying structures based on the type of sentence. In declarative sentences that include a nominal subject and object, the subject will precede the object. This particular word order is known as subject-object-verb or SOV.

References

External links
 Phonology of Enga
 A collection of open access recordings of Enga archived with Kaipuleohone.

Engan languages
Languages of Enga Province
Languages of Papua New Guinea